The 1981 FA Charity Shield was the 59th FA Charity Shield, an annual football match played between the winners of the previous season's Football League and FA Cup competitions. The match was played on 22 August 1981 at Wembley Stadium and played between 1980–81 Football League champions Aston Villa and FA Cup winners Tottenham Hotspur. The match ended in a 2–2 draw and the sides shared the trophy for six months each.

Peter Withe scored twice for Villa, and Mark Falco twice for Tottenham, in front of a 92,500-strong crowd.

Match details

See also
1980–81 Football League
1980–81 FA Cup

References

FA Community Shield
Charity Shield 1981
Charity Shield 1981
Charity Shield
Comm
Charity Shield